Devynne Ashtyn Charlton (born 26 November 1995) is a Bahamian athlete specialising in the 100 metres hurdles. She won the silver medal in the event at the 2022 Commonwealth Games. Charlton took gold for the 60 m hurdles at the 2022 World Indoor Championships, setting a national record of 7.81 seconds.

She represented the Bahamas at the 2020 Tokyo Olympics, finishing sixth in the 100 m hurdles event.

Charlton also represented her country at the 2015 and 2017 World Championships in Athletics, where she was eliminated in the heats and in the semifinals respectively.

Personal life
She studied at St Augustine's College in Nassau, Bahamas. She later graduated from Purdue University.

Achievements

International competitions

Personal bests
 60 metres indoor – 7.26 (Geneva 25 FEB 2017)
 60 metres hurdles indoor – 7.81 (Belgrade 19 MAR 2022) 
 100 metres – 11.22 (+0.6 m/s) (Bloomington, IN 13 MAY 2018)
 200 metres – 23.61 (+1.4 m/s) ([[[Bloomington, Indiana|Bloomington, IN]] 11 MAY 2018)
 100 metres hurdles – 12.46 (-0.1 m/s) (Eugene, OR 24 JUL 2022)

References

1995 births
Living people
Athletes (track and field) at the 2015 Pan American Games
Athletes (track and field) at the 2019 Pan American Games
Bahamian female hurdlers
Bahamian female sprinters
Pan American Games competitors for the Bahamas
Purdue Boilermakers women's track and field athletes
Purdue University alumni
World Athletics Championships athletes for the Bahamas
Sportspeople from Nassau, Bahamas
Athletes (track and field) at the 2020 Summer Olympics
Olympic athletes of the Bahamas
World Athletics Indoor Championships medalists
Commonwealth Games silver medallists for the Bahamas
Commonwealth Games medallists in athletics
Athletes (track and field) at the 2022 Commonwealth Games
Medallists at the 2022 Commonwealth Games